Bathynanus is a genus of brachiopods belonging to the family Chlidonophoridae.

The species of this genus are found in Indian and Pacific Ocean.

Species:

Bathynanus dalli 
Bathynanus inversus 
Bathynanus rhisopodus 
Bathynanus rhizopodus 
Bathynanus tenuicostatus

References

Brachiopod genera'